Kaspar is a given name and surname which may refer to:

Given name:
 Kaspar, Count Palatine of Zweibrücken (1459 – c. 1527)
 Kaspar Albrecht (1889–1970), Austrian architect and sculptor
 Kaspar Amort (1612–1675), German painter
 Caspar Aquila, sometimes spelled Kaspar, (1488–1560), German theologian and reformer
 Kaspar or Caspar Barlaeus (1584–1648), Dutch polymath, Renaissance humanist, theologian, poet and historian
 Kaspar Anton von Baroni-Cavalcabo (1682–1759), Italian painter
 Kaspar von Barth (1587–1658), German philologist and writer
 Kaspar Bausewein (1838–1903), German operatic bass
 Kaspar or Gáspár Bekes (1520–1579), Hungarian nobleman
 Kaspar Anton Karl van Beethoven (baptized 1774, died 1815), brother of composer Ludwig van Beethoven
 Kaspar Brandner (1916–1984), German World War II soldier awarded the Knight's Cross of the Iron Cross
 Kaspar Braun (1807–1877), German wood engraver
 Kaspar Brunner (died 1561), Swiss mechanic best known for his construction of the clockwork of the Zytglogge, Bern's medieval clock tower
 Gaspare Kaspar Capparoni (born 1964), Italian actor
 Kaspar Dalgas (born 1976), Danish former footballer
 Kaspar Eberhard (1523–1575), German Lutheran theologian and teacher
 Kaspar Faber (1730–1784), German entrepreneur, founder of the stationery company Faber-Castell
 Kaspar Flütsch (born 1986), Swiss alpine snowboarder
 Kaspar Förster (baptized 1616, died 1673), German singer and composer
 Kaspar Füger (c. 1521 – after 1592), German Lutheran pastor and hymn writer
 Kaspar Fürstenau (1772–1819), German flautist and composer
 Kaspar Hauser (1812? – 1833), German youth who claimed to have grown up in total isolation in a darkened cell
 Kaspar or Caspar Hennenberger (1529–1600), German Lutheran pastor, historian and cartographer
 Kaspar Karsen (1810–1896), Dutch painter
 Kaspar Kokk (born 1982), Estonian cross-country skier
 Kaspar K. Kubli, Jr. (1869–1943), American politician
 Kaspar Kummer (1795–1870), German flautist, professor and composer
 Kaspar Munk (born 1971), Danish film director
 Kaspar Oettli, Swiss orienteer who won a silver medal in the relay at the 1987 world championships
 Kaspar Röist (died 1527), Swiss papal official and commander of the papacy's Swiss Guard
 Kaspar Rostrup (born 1940), Danish film director
 Kaspar or Caspar Schwenckfeld (1489 or 1490–1561), German theologian, writer and preacher
 Kaspar Gottfried Schweizer (1816–1873), Swiss astronomer
 Kaspar Maria von Sternberg (1761–1838), Bohemian theologian, mineralogist, geognost, entomologist and botanist
 Kaspar von Stieler (1632–1707), soldier-poet and linguist
 Kaspar or Kasper Straube, German 15th century printer
 Kaspar Taimsoo (born 1987), Estonian rower
 Kaspar Treier (born 1999), Estonian basketball player
 Kaspar Ursinus Velius (c. 1493–1539), German humanist scholar, poet and historian
 Kaspar Villiger (born 1941), Swiss businessman and politician
 Kaspar Zehnder (born 1970), Swiss conductor and flautist
 Kaspar von Zumbusch (1830–1915), German sculptor

Surname:
 Danny Kaspar (born 1954), American college basketball head coach
 Felix Kaspar (1915–2003), Austrian figure skater and two-time world champion
 Mizzi Kaspar (1864–1907), mistress of Rudolf, Crown Prince of Austria
 Kašpar, a list of people with the Czech surname

See also
 Casper (disambiguation)
 Kasper (given name), a list of people with the given name
 Kaspars, a Lithuanian given name, and a list of people with that name
 Azerbaijan Caspian Shipping Company, abbreviated as Kaspar

Estonian masculine given names
German masculine given names